243 (two hundred [and] forty-three) is the natural number following 242 and preceding 244.

Additionally, 243 is:
the only 3-digit number that is a fifth power (35).
a perfect totient number.
the sum of five consecutive prime numbers (41 + 43 + 47 + 53 + 59).
an 82-gonal number.

References 

Integers